Judge Fischer may refer to:

Dale S. Fischer (born 1951), judge of the United States District Court for the Central District of California
Israel F. Fischer (1858–1940), judge of the United States Customs Court 
Nora Barry Fischer (born 1951), judge of the United States District Court for the Western District of Pennsylvania

See also
Judge Fisher (disambiguation)
Justice Fisher (disambiguation)